Sainyabuli, (alternatively spelled Xaignabouli, Xayaburi, or Xayaboury) is the capital of Sainyabuli Province, Laos. It lies on Route 4 which along with Route 13 connects it to Luang Prabang, roughly 80 kilometres northeast by road and to the Thai border across the Luang Prabang Range in the southwest. A passport control point is in the area. Sainyabuli Airport lies southwest of the town.

The capital stands on the banks of the Nam Hung, a tributary of the Mekong River towards the northern end of the province. The area is allegedly a heartland for military involvement in illegal timber trade.

Landmarks
Wat Si Bun Huang, a Buddhist temple of over 500 years vintage lies in the southern part of the town. Also of note is Wat Si Phan Don, noted for its diamond-shaped stupa and Wat Sisavang Vong, reputedly erected by King Sisavang Vong himself on the site of a former temple. The town contains a museum and library and two bus terminals each of which are about 2 kilometres north and south of the town respectively.

References

External links
 

Populated places in Sainyabuli Province
Provincial capitals in Laos